Bernardo Sainz Gallo (born April 15, 1985, in Mexico City, Mexico) is a former Mexican footballer who last played for Pumas Morelos in the Ascenso MX.

Career
He began his career 2007 with Monarcas Morelia but was later sent on loan to second-division clubs Alacranes de Durango, Dorados de Sinaloa and Club Tijuana. In 2008, he finally managed to get consistent play in the first division with Estudiantes Tecos but was once again sent down to the inferior divisions in 2009, playing for Mérida F.C. and Toros Neza. In 2012, he was sent on loan with first division club Puebla F.C. but is mainly used in the Copa Mexico.

Personal life
Bernardo Sainz has 2 brothers and one sister Inés Sainz who is a famous Mexican sport journalist .

References

External links
Player Profile esmas
Player Profile Record

1985 births
Living people
Footballers from Mexico City
Atlético Morelia players
Dorados de Sinaloa footballers
Club Tijuana footballers
Tecos F.C. footballers
Club Puebla players
Liga MX players
C.F. Mérida footballers
Toros Neza footballers
Mexican footballers
Association football forwards